Dream Chaser Tenacity is the first Dream Chaser spacecraft expected to fly in space. Manufactured by the Sierra Nevada Corporation, it will first fly to the International Space Station as part of the SNC Demo-1 mission in 2023, under the CRS-2 contract.

Background 
The Sierra Nevada Corporation was awarded a CRS-2 contract for by NASA for six operational resupply spaceflights to the International Space Station. SNC Demo-1 is a demo flight that will precede the operational resupply flights if the mission is successful.
 
Tenacity and other Dream Chasers will be mated with a Shooting Star module, which will provide an additional  of payload capacity, in addition to the  carried by the spaceplane. The module will be separated from the Dream Chaser prior to reentry and burn up in the atmosphere, while the Dream Chaser vehicle will perform a runway landing to be reused.
 
As of 2022, Tenacity is still under development. Overall, the spacecraft's structure is largely complete, but it is still being prepared for the mission.

Flights

References 

 
Individual space vehicles
Uncrewed spacecraft
Cargo spacecraft